Paolo Alboino della Scala (1344 – 17 or 18 October 1375) was a lord of Verona of the Scaliger dynasty. 

In 1351, after the death of his father Mastino II della Scala, he inherited the lordship of Verona and Vicenza, nominally together with his brothers Cangrande and Cansignorio although soon Cangrande stripped them of all effective power. 

When the latter was assassinated by Cansignorio in 1359, Paolo Alboino was associated in power. However, on 20 February 1365 he was arrested with the accusation of having conjured and imprisoned in Peschiera del Garda. In 1375 he was strangled by order of his nephew Bartolomeo II, who wanted sole power after the death of Cansignorio.

References

Medieval murder victims
Paolo Alboino
Assassinated Italian people
Assassinated heads of state
Deaths by strangulation
14th-century Italian nobility
Lords of Verona
1344 births
1375 deaths